Norkūnai is a village in Kėdainiai district municipality, in Kaunas County, in central Lithuania. According to the 2011 census, the village had a population of 21 people.

Demography

Notable people
Alvydas Kanapinskas (1952–1991), one of the victims of the 13 January Events.

References

Villages in Kaunas County
Kėdainiai District Municipality